Gallon smashing is the act of spilling a gallon of liquid, approximately 3.78 liters in the United States, usually by breaking its container (hence 'smashing'), in a manner that appears to be accidental. The act often involves throwing a gallon of milk onto a grocery store aisle, then falling, getting members of the public to help the 'smasher' get up, and sometimes having difficulty returning to a standing position. The act is generally done as a "prank" meant to share on the internet, and so typically recorded on camera.

History
Gallon smashing gained popularity in 2013 after three teenagers from Vienna, Virginia posted videos of the act on their YouTube channel. The videos received more than three million views before being taken down. Teenagers around the world mimicked the act, posting dozens of filmed incidents online.

In March 2013, the Fairfax County Police Department charged the teens with seven counts of disorderly conduct and destruction of property. That same month, a teenager from Sussex County, New Jersey was arrested and charged with criminal mischief and disorderly conduct after a video of him gallon-smashing was posted on Facebook. Citations for misdemeanor criminal mischief and theft were also issued in Butte, Montana in March 2013. Following the arrest in New Jersey, a spokesperson for Wakefern Food Corporation claimed that the company was taking steps to combat the trend.

Gallon smashing has led to several cases of actual injuries, usually as a result of the participant or unwitting members of the public slipping and falling after the liquid is spilt, while the act of throwing heavy gallon bottles during challenge attempts has also resulted in participants damaging shelving and refrigerator units in supermarkets. In the United Kingdom, one attempt resulted in the vandal receiving a broken jaw.
The viral nature of gallon-smashing has been compared to the Harlem Shake, planking (people lying face-down in public settings), and Tebowing.

See also
 Milk chugging
 Plastic milk container

References

2010s fads and trends
2013 YouTube videos
Challenges
Internet memes introduced in 2013
Viral videos
Vandalism